Guy XVII, Comte de Laval is a  oil painting by François Clouet.

References

1540 paintings
Paintings in the collection of the Timken Museum of Art
Paintings of people